Wandering Daughters is a 1923 American comedy drama film directed by James Young and written by James Young and Lenore Coffee. The film stars Marguerite De La Motte, William V. Mong, Mabel Van Buren, Marjorie Daw, Noah Beery Sr., and Pat O'Malley. The film was released on July 1, 1923, by Associated First National Pictures.

Cast      
Marguerite De La Motte as Bessie Bowden
William V. Mong as Will Bowden
Mabel Van Buren as Annie Bowden
Marjorie Daw as Geraldine Horton
Noah Beery Sr. as Charles Horton
Pat O'Malley John Hargraves
Allan Forrest as Austin Trull
Alice Howell as Bowden Servant

References

External links

1923 films
1923 comedy films
First National Pictures films
Films directed by James Young
American silent feature films
American black-and-white films
1920s English-language films
1920s American films
Silent American comedy films